Gustaaf Adolf Frederik Molengraaff (27 February 1860 – 26 March 1942) was a Dutch geologist, biologist and explorer. He became an authority on the geology of South Africa and the Dutch East Indies.

Gustaaf Molengraaff studied mathematics and physics at Leiden University. From 1882 he studied at Utrecht University. As a student he made his first journey overseas when he joined the 1884–1885 expedition to the Dutch Antilles led by Willem Frederik Reinier Suringar and Karl Martin. He became PhD with a thesis on the geology of Sint Eustatius. He studied crystallography in Munich, where he also took the opportunity to study the geology of the Alps nearby.

In 1888 Molengraaff took a job as a teacher at the University of Amsterdam. Before his assignment courses in geology were given by the chemist Jacobus Henricus van 't Hoff. During his assignment in Amsterdam, Molengraaff travelled to South Africa to study gold deposits (1891) and to Borneo (1894) where he explored large parts of the inland. Teaching at Amsterdam was not to his liking, because there were too little materials and students available.

In 1897 Molengraaff became "state geologist" of the Transvaal Republic. His task was to start the geological survey of the Transvaal. While mapping the Transvaal he discovered the Bushveld complex. In 1900 he got involved in the Second Boer War and had to return to the Netherlands. This gave him time to write a report on the geology of the Transvaal, and travel to Celebes, where he (again) studied gold deposits.

Due to his reputation as a geologist he could return to South Africa in 1901 to work as a geological consultant. One of his assignments was to describe the newly found Cullinan diamond for the Central Bank of South Africa. Meanwhile the Boer War still had his attention. One of his ideas was to give each soldier a small tin identity card, which later became practice in armies around the world.

In 1906 he became professor at Delft University and this time he got enough resources and students to make his work successful. The same year he became member of the Royal Netherlands Academy of Arts and Sciences. In 1910-1911 he led a geological expedition to Timor. His research at Delft was mainly on the material collected during that expedition, and on the geology of the Netherlands. In 1927 he was a guide of the Shaler Memorial Expedition to South Africa, organized by Harvard University. On the expedition he met Alexander Du Toit, both geologists were among the (at that time rare) supporters of Alfred Wegeners' continental drift theory.

Molengraaff was a close friend of W. F. Gisolf, who named his youngest son after him but died in a Japanese concentration camp. 

Molengraaff retired in 1930.

References

Sources
 F. R. van Veen, 2004, Gustaaf Molengraaff, een avontuurlijk geleerde 
 H. A. Brouwer, 1942: Levensbericht van Gustaaf Adolf Frederik Molengraaff in jaarboek der K.N.A.W. 1941–1942
 A. J. Pannekoek, 1962: Geological research at the universities of the Netherlands, 1877–1962 in Geologie & Mijnbouw, vol. 41 no. 4 pp. 161–174

External links 
 

19th-century Dutch explorers
19th-century Dutch geologists
20th-century Dutch East Indies people
20th-century Dutch explorers
20th-century Dutch geologists
1860 births
1942 deaths
Academic staff of the Delft University of Technology
Leiden University alumni
Members of the Royal Netherlands Academy of Arts and Sciences
People from Nijmegen
Academic staff of the University of Amsterdam
Utrecht University alumni
Wollaston Medal winners
Presidents of the Geological Society of South Africa